Artyom Gennadyevich Bykov (born 19 October 1992) is a Belarusian professional football player who plays for Dinamo Minsk.

International goal 
Scores and results list Belarus' goal tally first.

Honours
Dinamo Brest
Belarusian Premier League champion: 2019
Belarusian Super Cup winner: 2019, 2020

References

External links
 
 
 
 
 

1992 births
Living people
Belarusian footballers
Association football midfielders
Belarus international footballers
FC Energetik-BGU Minsk players
FC Dinamo Minsk players
FC Bereza-2010 players
FC Minsk players
FC Dynamo Brest players